The Men's long jump at the 2010 Commonwealth Games as part of the athletics programme was held at the Jawaharlal Nehru Stadium on Friday 8 and Saturday 9 October 2010.

Records

Results

Qualifying round
Qualification: Qualifying Performance 7.90 (Q) or 12 best performers (q) to the advance to the Final.

Final

External links
2010 Commonwealth Games - Athletics

Men's long jump
2010